Chitra may refer to:

Art
 Chitra (art), a historic art that includes paintings, sketching with or without multiple colors

People
 Chithra, Indian playback singer
 Chitra (actress), Indian film actress
 V. J. Chitra, Indian television actress
 Chitra Bahadur K.C., Nepalese politician
 Chitra Banerjee Divakaruni (born 1956), Indian-American author, poet, and professor of English
 Chitra Bharucha (born 1945), former Consultant Haematologist and Vice Chair of the BBC Trust
 Chitra Dewi (1934–2008), Indonesian actress
 Chitra Ganesh (born 1975), artist based in Brooklyn, New York
 Chitra Lekha Yadav, Nepalese politician
 Chitra Mudgal (born 1944), literary figure in modern Hindi literature
 Chitra Ramanathan, contemporary Indian American visual artist, abstract painter
 Chitra Sarwara (born 1975), Indian politician from Haryana
 Chitra Singh (born 1945), female ghazal singer
 Chitra Soman (born 1983), Indian sprinter
 Chitra Subramaniam (born 1958), Indian journalist
 Chitra Visweswaran, classical dancer

Zoology
 Chitra (genus), a turtle genus from Asia
 Sandfly, a biting fly found in sandy areas

Institutions
 Sree Chitra Tirunal Institute for Medical Sciences and Technology, Thiruvananthapuram, India
 Sree Chitra Thirunal College of Engineering, Thiruvananthapuram, India

Other uses
 Chitra (1946 film), a 1946 Tamil-language film
 Chitra (2001 film), a 2001 Kannada-language film
 Chitra (play), a 1914 play by Rabindranath Tagore
 Chitra nakshatra, in Hindu astrology, a nakshatra (lunar mansion) corresponding to the constellation Spica
 Chitra River, a river in the Narail District of southwestern Bangladesh
 Chitrakar, painters and mask makers
 Chitra, a 1960 ballet by Niyazi
 Chitra, Deoghar, a village in Jharkhand, India